Marmorofusus philippii is a species of sea snail, a marine gastropod mollusc in the family Fasciolariidae, the spindle snails, the tulip snails and their allies.

Distribution
This marine species occurs off Western Australia

References

External links
 Philippi, R. A. (1842-1850). Abbildungen und Beschreibungen neuer oder wenig gekannter Conchylien unter Mithülfe meherer deutscher Conchyliologen. Cassel, T. Fischer
 Sowerby, G. B., II. (1842-1887). Thesaurus Conchyliorum: Or monographs of genera of shells. London, privately published: vol. 1: p. 1-438, pl. 1-91 [cover date 1847; vol. 2: p. 439 899, pl. 92-186 [cover date 1855]; vol. 3: p. 1-331, pl. 187-290 [cover date: 1866]; vol. 4 p. 1-110, pl. 292-423 [cover date 1880]; vol. 5: p. 1-305, pl. 424-517 [cover date 1887] - Details of dates in Petit R.E. 2009 Zootaxa 2189: 35-37]
 Finlay H.J. (1930). Invalid molluscan names. No. 1. Transactions of the New Zealand Institute. 61: 37-48
 Menke K.T. (1843). Molluscorum Novae Hollandiae specimen. Hannover: Libraria Aulica Hahniana. 46 pp.
 Lyons W.G. & Snyder M.A. (2019). Reassignments to the genus Marmorofusus Snyder & Lyons, 2014 (Neogastropoda: Fasciolariidae: Fusininae) of species from the Red Sea, Indian Ocean, and southwestern Australia. Zootaxa. 4714(1): 1-64.

philippii
Gastropods described in 1846
Gastropods of Australia